Goose Creek is a neighborhood of Louisville, Kentucky located where Goose Creek meets the Ohio River. It should not be confused with the adjacent incorporated city of Goose Creek.

References

Neighborhoods in Louisville, Kentucky